Pablo Dreyfus (1969/70 – 1 June 2009) was an Argentine arms control expert who worked in South America, particularly Brazil, to help end the illegal weapons trade prevalent in South America. His work as a consultant and opinion as an expert in his field was in demand worldwide years before the time of his death, in the crash of Air France Flight 447. 

Dreyfus encouraged better accounting of weapons to prevent them falling into the hands of criminal organizations. He pushed for legislation requiring stricter controls on the labelling of ammunition. He raised the alarm about practices that facilitated arms smuggling in Argentina, Brazil, Paraguay and Venezuela, which led to legislation in Brazil. He supported the development of anti-gunrunning security in Mozambique, Angola, El Salvador and other countries. 

Following the theft of grenades from an Argentine military garrison in 2006, Dreyfus remarked "If a supermarket can keep control of the amount of peas it has in stock, surely a military organization could and should be able to do the same with equal if not greater efficiency with its weapons. The key words are logistics, control, security."

Born in Buenos Aires, Dreyfus got his PhD in International Relations at the Institut Universitaire de Hautes Études Internationales (Graduate Institute of International Studies) where his emphasis was Transnational Crime patterns.  At 2009, he was the research coordinator of the Small Arms and Light Weapons cluster in a local NGO in Rio, Associate Professor of the Superior Institute of Religious Studies, consultant of Small Arms Survey, senior researcher and professor of the Latin American Social Sciences Institute (FLACSO) and coordinator of the Friedrich-Ebert-Stiftung (FES) Brazilian think tank of regional security. Dreyfus became better known in the English-speaking world for his work for Viva Rio.

His wife, sociologist and researcher Ana Carolina Rodrigues, was with him at the time of the accident. Ana herself was finishing her PhD in one of the top research institutes of Rio de Janeiro, the Instituto Universitário de Pesquisas do Rio de Janeiro (IUPERJ) at Universidade Cândido Mendes. She was working with children involved in organized armed violence, and had previously worked on social movements and minorities. 

Pablo was also the son of renowned and award-winning Argentine ad man, Gabriel Dreyfus.

Citations

External links 
 Conventional Ammunition in Surplus A Reference Guide. Edited by James Bevan, January 2008. Co-published with BICC, FAS, GRIP, and SEESAC with support from the German Federal Foreign Office

2009 deaths
Argentine academics
Arms control people
Air France Flight 447 victims
Year of birth uncertain
Graduate Institute of International and Development Studies alumni